Trey Waltke (born March 16, 1955) is a former professional tennis player from the U.S. active during the 1970s and 1980s. 

Waltke came from St. Louis, Missouri, and he was one of the few players to beat John McEnroe and Jimmy Connors in the same year. During a first-round match at Wimbledon in 1983 against Stan Smith, Waltke caused a stir when he donned 1920s-era long flannel pants, a white buttoned-down long-sleeved shirt, and a necktie for a belt. He beat Smith in five sets but lost to Ivan Lendl in the second round.

Grand Prix career finals

Singles (2 runners-up)

Doubles (3 runners-up)

References

External links
 
 

1955 births
Living people
American male tennis players
California Golden Bears men's tennis players
Tennis players from Los Angeles